Georginio Gregion Emile Wijnaldum (formerly Boateng; born 11 November 1990) is a Dutch professional footballer who plays as a midfielder for Serie A club Roma, on loan from Ligue 1 club Paris Saint-Germain, and the Netherlands national team. Lauded by some in his prime as one of the best midfielders in the world, Wijnaldum is noted for his high work-rate and impressive technical ability.

A youth product of Eredivisie side Feyenoord, Wijnaldum became the youngest player ever to represent the club when he made his debut in 2007, and went on to play 134 matches over the course of a five-year spell, winning the KNVB Cup in 2008. Following his departure from Feyenoord, Wijnaldum spent four seasons at PSV Eindhoven, where he won the KNVB Cup in his first season and the Eredivisie in his last, a season where he also earned the Dutch Footballer of the Year award. 

In 2015, Wijnaldum joined Premier League side Newcastle United for £14.5 million, before departing following the club's relegation a year later to join Liverpool in a £23 million deal. At Liverpool, Wijnaldum took on a role deeper in the midfield than in his previous clubs. In the 2018–19 season, Wijnaldum scored twice against Barcelona in the Champions League semi-final second leg comeback as Liverpool went through 4–3 on aggregate, and he started as the club were victorious in the 2019 UEFA Champions League Final. In the following season, he played an integral role as Liverpool won the UEFA Super Cup, FIFA Club World Cup and Premier League, the club's first league title in 30 years. Wijnaldum appeared 237 times in a Liverpool shirt and is often regarded as a club legend who played a major part in Liverpool’s successes over his years at the club. Wijnaldum signed for French club Paris Saint-Germain in 2021 on a free transfer.

Wijnaldum is also a full Dutch international, having earned over seventy caps since making his debut in 2011, and was a member of the squad which finished third at the 2014 FIFA World Cup and runners-up in the 2018–19 UEFA Nations League.

Early life
Wijnaldum was born and raised in Rotterdam, South Holland. When he was six years old, his parents, who are both of Surinamese descent, went through a divorce resulting in his mother moving to Amsterdam. However, Wijnaldum stayed in Rotterdam and moved in with his grandmother, where he lived for the remainder of his childhood.

In Wijnaldum's younger years, he never showed interest in football. He never played with a ball or watched football on TV. His ambition was to become a gymnast or acrobat. This changed when Wijnaldum's cousin asked him to come to Sparta Rotterdam's opening day with him; then he was invited to the Sparta Rotterdam youth academy and his love for football started to grow slowly.

Wijnaldum has two younger brothers, one of whom, Giliano Wijnaldum, most recently played for Sparta Rotterdam, as well as a half-brother, Rajiv van La Parra, who most recently played for Apollon Smyrnis. Wijnaldum was formerly known as Georginio Boateng, but following his mother's divorce, he took her maiden name (Wijnaldum).

Club career

Early career
At age six, Wijnaldum developed himself rapidly at Sparta Rotterdam, winning two championship titles in his first two seasons. Soon Ajax, PSV and Feyenoord showed interest in the youngster, but Wijnaldum declined all offers: "I didn't watch football on TV and I didn't know any of the first team players of Sparta or any of the top clubs. I only knew the real famous players of Oranje, so the offers didn't impress me much. I had a good time at Sparta, I wanted to stay." After playing for Sparta Rotterdam for seven seasons and representing the Netherlands at various youth levels, Wijnaldum decided to accept a new Feyenoord offer. He was convinced playing for Feyenoord was better for his development as a football player and believed in Feyenoord's vision.

At Feyenoord, Wijnaldum joined a successful generation with the likes of Leroy Fer and Luís Pedro. Wijnaldum stood out as an exceptional talent. In January 2007, a few weeks after turning 16, Wijnaldum was invited to the first team's training camp in Belek, Turkey, by Feyenoord manager Erwin Koeman.

Feyenoord

On 8 April 2007, Wijnaldum made his official debut in Feyenoord's starting line-up in the 4–0 Eredivisie home defeat to Groningen. At the age of 16 and 148 days, Wijnaldum became the youngest player ever to play in Feyenoord's first team and was chosen Feyenoord's man of the match. On 2 December 2007, Wijnaldum scored his first Eredivisie goal for Feyenoord, against Heracles Almelo in a 6–0 home win.

In the 2008–09 season, Wijnaldum made his official European debut. On 18 September 2008, he was named in the starting line-up in the 1–0 UEFA Cup home loss to Kalmar FF. On 2 October 2008, he scored his first European goal for Feyenoord in the return match over Kalmar FF, which resulted in a 1–2 win and a place in the competition's group stage.

On 6 March 2009, Wijnaldum signed a new contract at Feyenoord which would have kept him at De Kuip until summer 2012. On 27 February 2011, he helped his struggling Feyenoord to a 5–1 demolition of Groningen, scoring four goals. He scored two goals from open play in the first half and two more from the penalty spot to add his total for the season to eight goals.

PSV

On 29 June 2011, the technical director of Feyenoord announced the club had reached a transfer deal for Wijnaldum reported to be worth €5 million with PSV. On the opening day of the 2011–12 Eredivisie season, Wijnaldum made his debut for PSV in a 3–1 loss against AZ. On 21 August 2011, Wijnaldum scored his first goal for PSV in a 3–0 victory against ADO Den Haag. Since joining the club, Wijnaldum established himself in the starting 11 as he scored goals and developed assists from his attacking role in midfield in Eredivisie, the KNVB Cup and the UEFA Europa League. After the retirement of Mark van Bommel and the departure of Kevin Strootman in the summer of 2013, Wijnaldum was named PSV's captain for the 2013–14 Eredivisie season. However, he played just 11 matches that year, scoring four goals, due to a back injury. For the 2014–15 Eredivisie season, Wijnaldum returned to full fitness and captained PSV to their first Eredivisie title since 2008.

Newcastle United
On 11 July 2015, Wijnaldum joined English Premier League club Newcastle United on a five-year contract, for a reported transfer fee of £14.5 million, making him the most expensive signing of Mike Ashley's ownership. Wijnaldum made his debut on 9 August as Newcastle began the season with a 2–2 home draw against Southampton, heading in a goal from Gabriel Obertan's cross. He would score his second Newcastle goal in a 2–2 draw with Chelsea on 26 September. On 18 October, Wijnaldum scored four goals in a 6–2 home win over Norwich City, becoming only the second Newcastle player to score more than three goals in a Premier League match. Wijnaldum was considered the player of the match in a game against Liverpool when he forced Martin Škrtel into an own goal as well as scoring himself in a 2–0 win. He scored against Manchester United in a 3–3 draw on 12 January 2016, and again four days later in a 2–1 win against West Ham United, and later scored twice against Tottenham Hotspur in a 5–1 win on the final day of the season, finishing the season as Newcastle's top goalscorer. However, after the season, Newcastle were relegated to the Championship.

Liverpool
On 22 July 2016, Wijnaldum returned to the Premier League, signing for Liverpool on a five-year contract, for an initial £23 million with a further £2 million in conditional add-ons. He was given the number 5 shirt.

2016–17 season 
Wijnaldum made his Premier League debut for Liverpool against Arsenal on 14 August 2016, where he played 80 minutes and provided an assist for Adam Lallana before being replaced by Kevin Stewart. He scored his first goal for the club in a 6–1 thrashing of Watford on 6 November. On 31 December, he scored the match's only goal with a powerful header in Liverpool's 1–0 win over Manchester City to take Liverpool four points clear in second. He was highly praised for his goal. Wijnaldum sealed Liverpool's 3–1 win over Arsenal on 4 March 2017 with a close-range finish in stoppage time. In the final match of the 2016–17 Premier League season, with Liverpool needing a win over Middlesbrough to secure a top-four finish and a 2017–18 UEFA Champions League berth, Wijnaldum opened the scoring with a first-half stoppage time goal as Liverpool won 3–0.

2017–18 season 
On 28 October 2017, Wijnaldum scored his first goal of the 2017–18 season, scoring the third goal in Liverpool's 3–0 win over newly-promoted Huddersfield Town. On 2 May 2018, Wijnaldum scored his first away goal since May 2015, and his first for an English club, when he netted in a 7–6 aggregate victory over Roma to help Liverpool progress to the final of the 2017–18 Champions League. His goal also saw Liverpool break the competition's record for the most goals scored in a single campaign, with the club's tally of 46 surpassing the record of 45 previously held by Barcelona. Wijnaldum played for Liverpool in the 2018 UEFA Champions League Final against Real Madrid, playing the full 90 minutes as Liverpool lost 1–3.

2018–19 season 

On 15 September 2018, Wijnaldum scored his first ever Premier League away goal, scoring the opening goal in a 2–1 win over Tottenham Hotspur. He made his 100th appearance for the club on 29 September in a 1–1 Premier League draw with Chelsea. On 14 April 2019, and against the same opposition, he made his 100th Premier League appearance for Liverpool. Notably coming on as a substitute in the second leg of the Champions League semi-final against Barcelona, Wijnaldum scored twice in two minutes to draw Liverpool level with Barcelona at 3–3 on aggregate before Divock Origi's second goal of the night sent Liverpool to the final. In the final, Liverpool went on to beat Tottenham Hotspur 2–0.

2019–20 season
At the start of the 2019–20 season, Wijnaldum was first choice in Liverpool's competitive midfield selection. Following Manchester City's FA Cup and League double the previous season, Liverpool were invited to the 2019 FA Community Shield as the league runners-up. Wijnaldum was named in the starting lineup, playing the full match and was one of Liverpool's penalty takers in the subsequent penalty shoot-out but missed what turned out to be the crucial penalty as Man City won 5–4 on spot-kicks. After starting against Norwich City in the Red's opening Premier League game, he was on the bench for the 2019 UEFA Super Cup which Liverpool had qualified for via last seasons Champions League win. Wijnaldum was brought on for James Milner in the 64th minute. He played the remainder of the game but was not included among the penalty takers for the resulting shoot-out. Liverpool ended up winning 6–5 on penalties as Wijnaldum won his second trophy in three months. On 4 December 2019, just two days after being voted 26th in the polls for the 2019 Ballon d'Or award, Wijnaldum scored for Liverpool in the club's 5–2 Merseyside derby win over Everton as Liverpool extended their unbeaten run in league football to a club-record 32 matches. He was one of Liverpool's key players as they won their first league title in 30 years, playing in all but one of the club's 38 Premier League matches, scoring four goals.

2020–21 season 
During the 2020–21 season, Wijnaldum scored 3 goals in 51 appearances in all competitions for Liverpool. He helped the club make the quarter-finals of the Champions League and secure a spot for the following season in the competition. On 23 May 2021, Wijnaldum played his final match for Liverpool, a 2–0 win over Crystal Palace. Manager Jürgen Klopp officially confirmed his departure from the club at the end of his contract.

Paris Saint-Germain 
On 7 June 2021, Wijnaldum signed a three-year contract with Ligue 1 club Paris Saint-Germain (PSG), as reported by Fabrizio Romano and The Guardian. PSG reportedly "hijacked" a move for the midfielder by La Liga club Barcelona, offering him "twice the wage" Barcelona had offered. The move was officially announced on 10 June, and Wijnaldum’s presentation at PSG was on 22 July. He chose the number 18 jersey.

Wijnaldum scored his first two goals for PSG in a 2–2 Champions League draw against RB Leipzig on 3 November 2021. His first Ligue 1 goal came in a 1–1 away draw with Lens on 4 December, when he rescued a point with an injury-time header. By the end of the season, Wijnaldum had won the league title with Paris Saint-Germain.

Loan to Roma 
On 4 August 2022, Roma announced the signing of Wijnaldum on loan from Paris Saint-Germain. As part of the agreement, there is an option for the loan deal to be made permanent at the end of the 2022–23 season. On 14 August, he made his debut for the club, as a substitute, in a 1-0 away win against Salernitana in the Serie A. On 21 August it was announced that Wijnaldum had suffered a Tibia fracture in training and was expected to miss the majority of the 2022-23 season as well as the 2022 World Cup.

International career

Youth
Wijnaldum was one of the key players of the Netherlands under-17 squad on the 2007 UEFA European Under-17 Championship in Belgium. However, the team finished third in their group behind England and Belgium, failing to qualify for the knockout stage. Quickly after the tournament, Wijnaldum was selected for the Netherlands under-19 squad. Despite excellent individual performances, the team underachieved and failed to qualify for the 2008 UEFA European Under-19 Championship in the Czech Republic and 2009 UEFA European Under-19 Championship in Ukraine.

On 12 November 2008, the young midfielder got invited to the Netherlands B by manager Johan Neeskens. Wijnaldum had to deny the invitation due to an injury.

Wijnaldum had to deny his first Netherlands under-21 invitation on 9 August 2009. He received an invitation for the friendly match against England by manager Cor Pot. Wijnaldum made his official Netherlands under-21 debut on 4 September 2009 in the 2011 UEFA European Under-21 Championship qualification match against Finland, which ended in a 2–0 victory.

Senior

On 30 May 2011, Wijnaldum was named in the Netherlands senior squad for friendlies against Brazil and Uruguay, but did not play in either match. He made his international debut in the match against San Marino on 2 September 2011, appearing as a substitute in the 86th minute and promptly scoring the final goal in an 11–0 win.

Wijnaldum was a member of the Netherlands squad for the 2014 FIFA World Cup, and scored his second goal for the nation in a 3–0 win against Brazil in the third-place play-off.

On 9 September 2018, he made his 50th appearance for the Netherlands in a 2–1 UEFA Nations League loss to France.

In November 2019, following racist abuse aimed at Ahmad Mendes Moreira in the Eredivisie, Wijnaldum celebrated an international goal by gesturing at his skin colour in support of Mendes Moreira.

In November 2020, following an anterior cruciate ligament injury to captain and club teammate Virgil van Dijk, Wijnaldum was named captain of the Netherlands team in his absence.

On 23 June 2021, during the Euro 2020, Wijnaldum announced that he would wear a rainbow armband under the slogan OneLove during the Netherlands' game of the Round of 16 in a show of solidarity to both the LGBT community and German captain Manuel Neuer who had a case opened against him at UEFA for wearing the rainbow armband. The case was later dismissed. Wijnaldum was not called up to the 2022 FIFA World Cup owing to a long-term injury.

Career statistics

Club

International

Scores and results list Netherlands' goal tally first, score column indicates score after each Wijnaldum goal

Honours
Feyenoord
KNVB Cup: 2007–08

PSV
Eredivisie: 2014–15
KNVB Cup: 2011–12
Johan Cruyff Shield: 2012

Liverpool
Premier League: 2019–20
UEFA Champions League: 2018–19; runner-up: 2017–18
UEFA Super Cup: 2019
FIFA Club World Cup: 2019

Paris Saint-Germain

 Ligue 1: 2021–22

Netherlands
FIFA World Cup third place: 2014
UEFA Nations League runner-up: 2018–19

Individual
Dutch Footballer of the Year: 2014–15
UEFA Champions League Squad of the Season: 2018–19
UEFA Nations League Finals Team of the Tournament: 2019
Rotterdam Talent of the Year: 2007

References

External links

 Profile at the A.S. Roma website
 Georginio Wijnaldum at Voetbal International 
 Official Georginio Wijnaldum profile on Feyenoord.nl 
 
 Holland U17 stats at OnsOranje
 Holland U19 stats at OnsOranje
 Holland U21 stats  at OnsOranje
 

1990 births
Living people
Footballers from Rotterdam
Dutch footballers
Netherlands youth international footballers
Netherlands under-21 international footballers
Netherlands international footballers
Association football midfielders
Feyenoord players
PSV Eindhoven players
Newcastle United F.C. players
Liverpool F.C. players
Paris Saint-Germain F.C. players
A.S. Roma players
Eredivisie players
Premier League players
Ligue 1 players
Serie A players
UEFA Champions League winning players
2014 FIFA World Cup players
UEFA Euro 2020 players
Dutch expatriate footballers
Expatriate footballers in England
Expatriate footballers in France
Expatriate footballers in Italy
Dutch expatriate sportspeople in England
Dutch expatriate sportspeople in France
Dutch expatriate sportspeople in Italy
Dutch sportspeople of Surinamese descent